Summer vacation or summer break is a school break in summer between school years and the break in the school academic year. Students are off anywhere between three weeks to three months. Depending on the country and district, staff might be partially or fully excluded.

In the United States, summer break is approximately two and a half months, with students typically finishing the school year between late-May and mid-June and starting the new year between late-August and early-September. About 4 percent of public schools in the U.S. use a  balanced calendar that operates year-round with a shorter summer break.

In Spain, Portugal, the Republic of Ireland, Italy, Greece, Georgia, Lithuania, Latvia, Lebanon, Romania and Russia, the summer break is normally three months, compared to three to six weeks (sometimes 3 months) in Australia, Brazil, the United Kingdom, Pakistan, Bangladesh, India, Denmark, the Netherlands, Slovakia and Germany.

Criticisms and support 
The research around the impact of summer vacation is mixed.  “Summer learning loss” (or “summer slide”) is the perceived loss of learning students experience due to interrupted education, but the exact consequences of extended breaks is unclear. Some research highlights that school holidays can be stressful periods for children from low-income families. Advocates of breaks tend to focus on the need to give children time away from the childhood stresses sometimes associated with school including peer pressure, cliques, bullying, and the pressure of heavy loads of homework.

By country

Africa

Egypt 
In Egypt, summer break lasts from the beginning or the middle of June until the middle of September (3 months / 14 weeks) in public schools, though the length slightly differs according to age. In most private schools, summer break lasts from the middle or end of June to the beginning of September, lasting 104 days (2.5 months / 10 weeks)

Ethiopia 
In Ethiopia, the school year usually ends in late May to mid-June and begins in mid-September (8 to 12 weeks).

Libya 
In Libya, summer break lasts from the beginning or the middle of June until the middle of September (3 Months – 14 Weeks). There are 5 other smaller vacations: Mid-year two-week break around February and two Hijri lunar calendar 3-day religious breaks for Eid Fitr (1-2 May in 2022) and Eid Adha (9-12 July in 2022).

Morocco 
In Morocco, summer vacation lasts from June 20th until the beginning of September (2 months).

Nigeria 
In Nigeria, primary and secondary Schools usually start summer vacation in mid-July and resume in the early weeks of September.  The vacation is also known as the "3rd-term holiday", and it is the longest break in a school year (typically up to two months). The "first-term break" starts between one and two weeks prior to Christmas and ends the first or second week in January, lasting for about three weeks. The "first-term break" is usually the shortest break in a school year. The "second-term break" usually starts a week before Easter and lasts for another three weeks. This gives a total of about 14 weeks of holiday in a year. The geographical location of the school is also a factor.

Tertiary institutions follow a different pattern, as the holiday in each school depends on various factors which include, the course of study and the academic calendar of the school. Some tertiary institutions observe their summer breaks in the normal summer period when elementary and high schools observe theirs, while others do not. Some courses of study also do not observe any significant holidays, such programmes include engineering, nursing, medicine and a few others. This is usually as a result of students doing their laboratory work, workshop practice, practicals, internship etc. (as the case may be), while the other students in other programmes are on holiday. Tertiary schools observe two semesters; while some schools observe a break after the first semester, many others have their breaks combined to just the summer holidays. This long break helps the students get good jobs during the holiday. The total length of break observed in tertiary institutions in a year is 12 to 14 weeks.

South Africa 
In South Africa, summer holidays usually begin in early December and end in mid-January. Winter break lasts from mid-June to early July, and there are 10 days of Easter holidays.

South Sudan 
In South Sudan, summer vacation starts on December 20 and ends on March 19.

Tunisia 
In Tunisia, summer vacation for the middle school (7th–9th grade) and high school starts from the first week of June (May 30) and ends on September 15. Primary schools leave on holiday from the third week of June (June 15th) until the 15th September.

America

Argentina 
In Argentina, the school year ends in early- or mid-December and starts late February or early March. Also the majority of students get two weeks of holidays during winter, which varies depending on the region of the country from late July or mid-July to early August.
 Primary education: From mid-December to late February (2 months)
 Secondary education: From early December to early March (3 months)
 University education: From last day of December (31 December) to early April

Barbados 
In Barbados, summer holiday dates have varied throughout the years due to the beginning of the hurricane season on June 1. Because of this, major storms affecting the island can cause schools to remain closed for days resulting in a pushback of vacation dates, for example with Hurricane Tomas in 2010. Currently, summer holiday begins in late June or early July and ends in the second week of September.

Bolivia 
In Bolivia, summer vacation runs from early December to early February (2 months).

Brazil 
In Brazil, summer holidays vary by region, state and school administration.

The education system in Brazil is federalised, with Federal, State and Municipal schools, all of which can establish their own calendars, alongside that, every federal entity may maintain schools on any of the educational levels, meaning that even in the same town a Municipal-maintained High School, a State-maintained High School, and a privately owned High School have differing calendars, resulting in summer holidays not being simultaneous throughout the country or even town.

The Federal Education Law (Lei de Diretrizes e Bases da Educação Nacional) determines that both Primary and Secondary Education shall consist of a minimum of 800 hours a year, distributed between a minimum of 200 school days, allowing schools to plan for school years that extend beyond the mandatory minimum.

In terms of dates, summer holidays might last between 45 and 60 days; from late November — early December, to late January — early February.

In addition, for the majority of Brazilian students there are two to four weeks off for winter in July; the winter holidays were held in August for 2016 only due to the 2016 Summer Olympics.

Canada 
In Canada, the first day of summer vacation for public schools is the last Saturday in June. However, in some provinces students get a Professional Activity day on the final Friday of that school week, and their last day would be on the Thursday. Depending on the province, students can get 2–3 months of summer vacation. This may vary in Quebec (earlier due to provincial June 24 holiday). The last day of summer vacation is Labour Day. This can vary in Private schools. School generally resumes the day after Labour Day (in September).

Chile 
In Chile, summer vacation lasts from early or mid-December until late February or early March (11, 11 or 12 weeks).

Colombia 
In Colombia, summer vacation varies. Colombia has an equatorial climate (see Climate of Colombia) and schools run two different calendars. Public schools and some private schools run "Calendar A" which has a break between June and July. Only some private schools run "Calendar B" in which there is a long vacation in July and August. One of the reasons for private schools to run "Calendar B" is to adapt their calendar to match the calendars of international schools (of the Northern Hemisphere) for summer courses and academic exchanges.

Costa Rica 
In Costa Rica, summer vacation lasts 2 months. Usually begin in late December and end in early February. There are a few schools using the "American" style, those school usually take vacations in late May and then resume again in early August.

Ecuador 
In Ecuador, summer vacation varies. Because of Ecuador's equatorial climate (see Climate of Ecuador for more information), schools run two different calendars. The coastal region runs vacation  January or February, but in the Sierra region, summer vacation follows the pattern in July and August.

Guatemala 
In Guatemala, the summer holidays start in middle October and end in early January (approx 12 weeks).

Guyana 
In Guyana, the summer holidays start in early July and end in early September (2 months).

Jamaica 
In Jamaica, summer holidays for primary and secondary schools starts in the first week of July and ends in the first week of September which gives a duration of about eight weeks. Tertiary institutions using the semester system typically have summer holidays starting in May (at the end of examinations) and ending in early September. This can, however, vary among institutions.

Mexico 
In Mexico, summer vacation starts in early July and finishes in mid-August since 2000. However, high school students (10th–12th grades) and college students have mostly two months of vacation: from late May or early June to early August.

Panama 
In Panama, summer vacation starts in early December for both public or private schools, and ends in late February (3 months).

Paraguay 
In Paraguay, summer holidays start in December and end in late February (2 months).

Saint Lucia 
In Saint Lucia, summer vacation starts in early July and ends on the first Monday of September (8 weeks).

Suriname 
In Suriname, summer vacation usually starts in mid-August and ends in early-October. In 2012, a change of summer vacation was proposed by several legislators having summer vacation the same time as the Caribbean Community. The proposed plan is summer vacation starts from mid-August and ends in early-October.

Trinidad and Tobago 
Primary and secondary schools close the first Friday of July and open on the first Monday of September (giving students two months). This can vary a day or two by school or year. International schools are in link with the British, Canadian, or American systems.

United States 
The dates vary depending on the location of the school district but generally follow the same schedules; most schools in the Northeastern United States end in June and start the Wednesday after Labor Day (the first Monday in September, with teachers reporting back on Tuesday), while the majority of schools in the Southern United States have schools end in May and start again in August.

The modern school calendar has its roots in 19th-century school-reform movements seeking standardization between urban and rural areas. Up until the mid-19th century, most schools were open for a winter and summer term. As individual schools merged into school districts and bureaucracies emerged to manage the newly formed school districts, school leaders and politicians identified a need to standardize calendars across regions. This standardization was related to the emerging tax structures, laws around compulsory education, as well as a general sentiment that school should be an essential component of American childhood.

As the calendar was standardized across regions, school leaders took cues from a variety of factors, including attendance rates and the difficulty cooling school buildings. Many upper-class families left the city for cooler climates in the northeast during hot summer months, and as such, schools cancelled their summer sessions due to low daily attendance. As train travel became more affordable, middle-class families followed similar patterns, keeping their children home during the hottest months of the year or going away for a summer vacation.

Additionally, many school leaders advocated for breaks so that students and teachers could rest their brains. Many 19th- and early 20th-century Americans educators believed that too much learning in hot weather was bad for one's health and could result in heat exhaustion and injury, particularly for younger children, whose minds were still developing. The extended summer break was seen as a way for children and their teachers to rest and recover. In many places, teachers would use the summer months for their own learning and professional development, including participating in seminars and courses like those held at Chautauqua.

While the origins of the summer holiday break are often believed to be rooted in agriculture and the idea children were needed to assist with planting and harvesting crops, this is inaccurate. Most crops were planted in the spring and harvested in the fall.

Uruguay 
In Uruguay, summer holidays usually begin in early December, and finishes on March 1.

Venezuela 
In Venezuela, summer holidays begin in late June or early July and end in late September or early October.

Asia

Bangladesh 
In Bangladesh, summer vacation begins in mid-May and ends in mid-June (4 weeks). Also, in many schools, the holiday during the month of Ramadan (Around mid-May to around mid-April) is passed off as a summer vacation. The summer there is associated with the availability of fruits such as mangoes (আম / aam) and jackfruits (কাঠাল / kaathaal). So, the summer vacation is sometimes known in Bangladesh as "আম-কাঠালের ছুটি", (pronounced as aam-kaathaaler chhuti), which roughly translates to "mango-jackfruit's holiday". Also, the summer vacation is sometimes not in line with the actual weather patterns during summer, resulting in students having to reach school in the heat.
The summer vacations are not given much importance in places except schools.

China 
In the People's Republic of China, summer holidays start in early July and often end in early September (2 months).

India  
India covers a wide spectrum of climates, resulting in a large variation in the start times and duration of summer vacation in different regions of the country.

In northern India, summer vacation typically begins in mid-May and ends by early July. The exceptions are the Himalayan Jammu & Kashmir, Uttarakhand, and Himachal Pradesh, where the summer break is short, and the winter break is much longer. For example, in Jammu & Kashmir, summer vacation is only for ten days, with a long winter break from mid-December to the end of February instead.

In central India, summer vacation begins in mid-April, and schools re-open in mid-June.

In the south, schools finish in the last week of April, and have the entire month of May for summer break, resuming anywhere in the first two weeks of June; at the start of the monsoon season. 

In the north-eastern states, a new school year commences before the holidays, in April. A few weeks later, schools finish for summer vacation between May and June, during the hottest months of the year.
In Uttar Pradesh, Summer Vacation Starts From 23 May and ends on 30 June (5 weeks and 4 days)

Moreover, summer vacation lasts for no more than six weeks in most schools. The duration may decrease to as little as two weeks for older students.

Iran 
In Iran, summer vacation lasts three months. Schools close in mid June and reopen in late September. However, most private high schools make it mandatory for students to attend school for around 2 months during summer. This means students end up having a 2-week break after finals, and another 2-week break before school starts again in late September.

Iraq 
In Iraq, summer vacation of school students begins in late May and ends on 1st October, but the 12th-grade vacation begins in late July and ends in November. For university students, it begins in late June and ends in late September.

Israel 
Summer vacation for middle school and high school students starts on June 21 and ends on August 31 (2 months and 10 days). Summer vacation for primary school students starts on July 1 and ends on August 31 (two months).

Hong Kong 
In Hong Kong, summer vacation normally begins in mid-July and ends on late August (6–7 weeks) for most public schools. However, the starting and ending times of international schools are variable. For example, most ESF-based schools start in late June and finish mid-August (7 weeks).

Japan 
In Japan, the summer vacation generally lasts from late July to early September, and due to the way education in Japan is structured, it takes place within a school year.

Jordan 
In Jordan, summer vacation lasts 3 months, and most schools take summer vacation from mid-June to mid-September.

Kuwait 
In Kuwait, summer vacation for elementary and middle schools [1st to 9th grade] starts at the end of May or at the beginning of June and ends at the beginning to late September, sometimes as far as early October (public schools). For high school students [10th to 12th grade], it starts on June 19–20 and ends at the same time as elementary and middle schools.

Lebanon 
In Lebanon, summer vacation lasts almost 3 months and most schools take summer vacation from mid-June to early-to-mid September.

Mongolia 
In Mongolia, summer vacation usually starts from late May or early June (varies between schools) to the end of August. The school year is divided into 4 terms (lasting 8 to 9 weeks each), and students take 1 week off after the first and second terms, and 2 weeks after the third term.

Nepal 
In Nepal, the academic session ends in the beginning of April or late April. So,there will be a vacation from late April to mid may. The first terminal exam is taken in mid July or late July and students get a summer vacation of 2 weeks usually in mid July or late july and in public schools students get a summer vacation of 1 months from early July to early August.

Oman 
In Oman, summer vacation starts in late May and ends in early September (3 months).

Pakistan 
In Pakistan, Summer vacation lasts for two to three months depending on the type of school (public or private). Typical summer vacation is from the end of May to mid-August. Many private schools are also open in June and July for 8th to 10th grades, with the schools calling the summer programmes "summer camps". However, it is a controversial issue between public and private schools.

Philippines 
In the Philippines, summer holidays for kindergarten, elementary, middle, and high schools typically start on the third week of March and end in the first to third week of June. This coincides with the country's tropical dry season months from March to June. Colleges and universities, however, offer summer classes for students who wants to take advanced subjects or those who fail to pass the prerequisites for the next school year. School year begins in the first week of June, the start of Philippines' wet season.

Select universities have adapted the school year schedule of other countries, starting the school year in September and having the summer holidays from June to August. Some of the schools that complied are still in transition, their academic calendars still beginning in July, others in August, with their summer vacations adjusted accordingly.

After the pandemic, most public schools have adopted the August to May school year schedule and has summer break at the end of may until early August.

Saudi Arabia 
Since the change in 2021–2022, school ends at last week of June and starts again on the first Sunday near September.

Singapore 

In Singapore, summer vacation lasts from the last week of May to the last week of June.

South Korea 
In South Korea, summer vacation starts in mid-July and ends in mid-August or late August. The South Korean summer vacation takes place within a school year.

Syria 
In Syria, summer vacation lasts 3 months.
It starts mid-June (for primary and secondary schools) and ends mid-September.
University students have a vacation from early July to early October. This varies 2 or 3 days by school or year.
The mid-term holiday is usually a week long.

Taiwan 
In Taiwan, summer vacation starts in early July (late June for university students) and ends in late August (mid-September for university students).

Thailand 
In Thailand, summer vacation begins in late February to early March and ends in mid-May.

Turkey 
In Turkey, summer vacation starts in mid-June and ends in early September (2.5 months). Almost all schools end around June 14-20 to start summer break and usually start again on September 1.

United Arab Emirates 
The summer vacation begins formally towards the beginning of July. All schools in the UAE are closed in July and August. All public and private sectors and schools enjoy two days weekends on Saturdays and Sundays.
The Knowledge and Human Development Authority (KHDA) also releases holiday updates for private schools in Dubai. Students will be getting a seven-week break during summer, a three-week break during winter, and a two-week break for spring.

Vietnam 
In Vietnam, summer holidays usually begin in late May or early June and last for two months.

Australasia

Australia 
In Australia, summer officially lasts from 1 December to 28 February, and therefore includes traditional holidays such as Christmas and New Year. The dates of Australian school holidays are determined by each state's education department. Typically summer holidays in Australia last approximately six weeks, usually from mid December (depending on school level) to late January. This is significantly shorter than North American summer holiday, but Australian schools also break for 2 weeks in April, June, and September, giving students and teachers a total of twelve weeks of annual holidays. In many public schools, years 10, 11 and 12 will finish before December 15, allowing time to complete exam marking and results. Year 10 commonly finishes at the end of November, Year 11 at the end of October, and year 12 (Senior Year) also at mid or the end of October after 3 weeks of end-of-year exams. This can bring the normal 12 weeks of vacation to 20 weeks of vacation.

The intervening periods of school operation without holidays are called "school terms", each term lasting approximately ten weeks. All Australian states have relatively similar holiday periods between each term, but there is the ability for this to change, as it did in the Melbourne 2006 Commonwealth Games, when the first term in Victorian schools was shortened to six weeks and the other subsequently extended to 12 weeks due to severe disruptions to the public and private bus networks used by school students. Most private schools in Australia have up to four weeks of additional holidays, due to their longer teaching hours during term.

New Zealand 
In New Zealand, the school holidays typically start in early to mid-December, and end in late January or early February, which is usually 6–8 weeks. Senior secondary school students in Years 11, 12 and 13 finish in late-October for study leave, and their summer holidays begin after their last exam, which is different depending on the subjects they take. All exams are over by late November or early December. University or polytech students do not start until mid-February or early March and finish in late-October or mid-November.

Europe

Austria 
In Austria, summer vacation dates vary by region, however the break lasts nine weeks throughout the whole country. School usually ends in early July and starts in early September.

Belgium 
In Belgium, summer vacation lasts in general from July 1 until September 1 (2 months).

Bosnia and Herzegovina 
In Bosnia and Herzegovina, the start of summer break varies by school, but usually starts at the beginning or mid-June. School starts on the first Monday of September.

Bulgaria 
In Bulgaria, the time of the break differs according to the grade of the students. The following periods are applied:

1st-3rd grade: May 31 – September 15

4th-6th grade: June 15 – September 15

7th-11th grade: June 30 – September 15

12th grade: School year ends in mid-May.

Croatia 
In Croatia, the school year finishes around 20 June and it usually starts on the first Monday of September, but if the first Monday is on 1st or 2 September, the school year will start on the second Monday.

Czech Republic 
In the Czech Republic, summer holiday begins on July 1 and ends on August 31 (2 months).

Denmark 
In Denmark, summer break lasts from the end of June to early or mid-August (6 weeks). High schools (colleges) usually return to school in early August, but for younger students it can be in the middle.

Estonia 
In Estonia, summer holidays start in the beginning of June, the date ranging for different grades. School begins every year on September 1.

Finland 
In Finland, summer vacation starts on Saturday (in week 22) in late May or in the beginning of June. The vacation lasts for 2 to 2 months. Usually, school starts again on a date between August 7 to 18.

France 
In France, summer vacation usually consists of July and August (2 months), though secondary school students finish in mid-June due to the senior's exams. This may vary for private schools.

Germany 
In Germany, summer vacation lasts six to six and a half weeks. The exact dates vary by state as well as from one to the next year, from the earliest (mid-June to late July) to the latest (late July to early September). In Germany, the annual holidays are split into winter holidays (about one week), Easter holidays (mostly about two weeks), summer holiday (about six and a half weeks), autumn holidays (about one to two weeks) and Christmas holidays (about one to two weeks). Some states like Bavaria also have holidays for Pentecost.

Greece 
In Greece, the summer vacation lasts for 3 and a half months. Schools close on June 15 and reopen on September 14. Universities generally close in mid-July, but with great differences between faculties.

Hungary 
In Hungary, summer vacation usually lasts from mid-June (15th) to early September (the first workday). This is about 11 or 12 weeks.

Iceland 
In Iceland, the duration of the summer vacation can vary from one school to another. Typically students start their summer vacation during the first week of June and return to school in the fourth week of August.

Ireland 
In the Republic of Ireland, most secondary schools start summer holidays at the end of May or the start of June. However, Junior and Leaving Certificate exams will take place during June. Schools will usually open again at the end of August to the start of September. Primary schools in the Republic of Ireland are sixteen days longer, so they start their summer holiday at the end of June but do not return until the first week of September. Private schools follow the same pattern.

Italy 
In Italy, summer vacation for elementary, middle and high schools normally starts the second week of June and lasts until the second week of September included, for a total of about three months. For kindergartens, summer vacation starts at the end of June and lasts until the first week of September. Final term examinations for middle school and high school are held until the end of June or the first days of July. Usually, also shops and factories are closed (or with reduced productivity) in the week surrounding August 15 - Ferragosto (both religious and secular holiday).

Latvia 
In Latvia, summer vacation lasts 3 months. Starting on 1 June and ending on 31 August, with the new school year starting the next day.

Lithuania 
In Lithuania, summer vacation starts in 15th learning day of June (ex. June 21) and ends on September 1 with the start of a new school year (2.5 months).

Luxembourg 
In Luxembourg, summer vacation starts on July 16 and ends on September 15, lasting a total of two months. There are 5 other smaller vacations: All Saints' Day (1 week), Christmas (2 weeks), Carnival (1 week), Easter (2 weeks), Pentecost (1 week). (See also holidays in Luxembourg)

North Macedonia 
In North Macedonia, the summer vacation starts on June 10 and ends on September 1 in every school. They also get Christmas vacations from 31 December until 21 January, and 1 week break for Easter.

Malta 
In Malta, the summer holidays usually last from the end of June until the end of September (3 months).

Moldova 
In Moldova, summer vacation begins on 1st of June and ends on 1st of September (3 months).

Netherlands 
In the Netherlands, summer vacation is about 6 weeks for primary school and high school, usually from mid-July to late August. Secondary school students officially get the same time off but there often is a one-week period before the vacation during which the student will only have to go to school for 2 days to receive their grade lists and bring back their books, making the holiday 7 weeks unofficially for high school students. However, this does not apply to every school. Students in their final year of high school typically end school around 2 months earlier. 

For higher education students, the same 6 week period applies officially. However, it can be significantly lengthened by a couple weeks if one does not have to repair their exam scores, making the holiday unofficially often 2 months or longer for many students.

Norway 
In Norway, summer vacation typically lasts from mid June to mid August, for a minimum of 8 weeks.

Poland 
In Poland, summer vacation starts on the first Friday after June 20th and ends on the first weekday of September except Friday or Saturday. In Poland, vacations are the colloquial name for summer holidays. Until the 2009/2010 school year, holidays covered the period from the day following the first Friday after June 18 to the last day of August in a given year, i.e. from the end of the school year to its restart in primary, middle and high schools. From 2011, holidays began on the Saturday after the last Friday in June and lasted until the end of August[a]. This change was introduced in connection with the increase in the number of days off during the school year. In 2017, the holidays began on June 23 and ended on September 3[1]. This is related to the new regulation, which assumes that didactic and educational classes will end on the first Friday after June 20.  If, starting from the school year 2018/2019, the feast of Corpus Christi falls on the Thursday directly preceding the Friday after June 20, classes end on the Wednesday preceding the day of this holiday[2].  In such a situation, the holiday will start on the day of this holiday.

Portugal 
In Portugal, summer vacation starts in mid-June, and finishes in the middle of September. Some students, though, have exams which are usually in the end of June (the first stage) and in July (the second stage, for the students that are willing to improve their marks).

Romania 
In Romania, summer vacation usually starts in mid-June and ends on the second Sunday of September (3 months). Since 2022, though, the end date was moved to the first Sunday of September.

For the 8th grade, summer break starts a week earlier before everyone else, whereas for the 12th (day) and 13th grades (evening and reduced frequentation) it starts 2 weeks earlier. For students attending the technological branch of secondary education, as well as those attending vocational and post-secondary education (with a few exceptions), summer vacation starts 1-2 weeks after everyone else.

Russia 
In Russia, summer vacation starts on May 25 with the end of an old school year (for 1st–8th and 10th grades) and ends on September 1 with the beginning of a new school year. For 9th and 11th grades, due to exams (EGE), the vacation starts in the middle (9th grade) or in the end (11th grade) of June.

Serbia 
In Serbia, the summer vacation starts around the ending of June, more precisely by the end of 2nd or 3rd week of June. Summer holiday ends on August 31. School officially starts on first working day of September (if September 1st is on Saturday or Sunday, starting of school is delayed until Monday).

Slovakia 
In Slovakia, Last day in school is usually the 30th of June and the first day in school after the vacation is usually the 2nd of September.

Slovenia 
In Slovenia, final exams are usually taken from mid-May to mid-June (high schools) or in June (primary schools). The last day of school is June 24, and school resumes on September 1.

Spain 
In Spain, the school year finishes in mid to late June and begins in early to mid-September. Vacation varies by region but often includes a family vacation to lower temperatures in the cooler regions in the north of Spain, or south or east to the Mediterranean beaches.

Sweden 
In Sweden, summer vacation is between the spring and autumn term. Normally it lasts for around 10 weeks, starting from the week before midsummer and ending in mid-August (normally the 8th week after midsummer). In Sweden, students end their term, either at a church or in their school, singing traditional summer songs like Den blomstertid nu kommer (normally only the first two verses).

Switzerland 
In Switzerland, summer vacation varies in each canton. As an example, in Zürich, it lasts five weeks and between mid-July and mid-August. In Ticino, it lasts about ten weeks between late June and early September.

United Kingdom 
In England and Wales, summer holidays for state schools usually last from late July through to early September, which gives a duration of six or seven weeks.

In Scotland, school summer holidays start in late June and last for about six or seven weeks, with most schools returning around mid-August. However, it is not uncommon for some schools in recent years to finish on the first week of July.

In Northern Ireland, most school summer holidays start in late-June and runs through to the beginning of September. Students doing exams (GCSEs and A-Levels) often get "study leave" from May and do the exams sometime in that month, or early-June.

In the United Kingdom, holiday dates for independent schools mostly differ from those of state schools; these differences typically take the form of an extra week's holiday at the beginning and end of each of the long holidays, meaning four weeks for the Christmas and Easter breaks and eight to ten weeks for the summer break, though variations in summer holidays length exist between independent schools themselves. The summer half-term break is determined by the break in public exams at the end of May. Some universities grant an extended "exam leave" to students which typically commences in early-April, so as to give students a good number of weeks to prepare for the summer exam season which usually starts in mid-to-late May and finishes in early or mid-June. Final year students at independent schools typically finish their time at school when their last exam in the summer exam season finishes, and as an encore; a special event is usually arranged for late-June by the school for leavers and staff as a way of providing an opportunity for final farewells to be bid. The universities they go on to typically schedule their first term to commence in early-October, giving school leavers an extended summer break between their time of leaving school and starting university.

See also 

 Summer camp
 Summer school
 School holiday
 Academic term
 Dog days

References 

Vacation
School terminology
Summer holidays

de:Schulferien#Sommerferien